Shauntay Renae Hinton (born February 26, 1979) is an American actress and beauty queen who won the Miss USA 2002.

Biography
Born and reared in her native Starkville, Mississippi, Hinton stepped into the national spotlight as Miss USA 2002. After attending Howard University in Washington D.C. with a major in broadcast journalism, she used her communication skills along with the coveted title of Miss USA to work on behalf of charitable organizations like Susan G. Komen For The Cure, Miriam's Kitchen, Gilda's House, the USO and the Muscular Dystrophy Association. Shauntay is credited for helping to raise $34 million for all her charitable causes in 2002. A frequent guest co-anchor/panelist debating current events and pop culture on HLN network programs including PRIME NEWS and SHOWBIZ TONIGHT, Shauntay is currently an anchor for the Sunrise Morning Show for North Mississippi's local CBS news affiliate, WCBI. Her other credits include a recurring role on Nickelodeon's "iCarly" as "Jessica Warner", hosting lifestyle and entertainment programming for NBC, Fox Sports, Fox Movie Channel, Lifetime, HGTV, Twentieth Television, BET, TV One, Current TV and The History Channel. Shauntay also serves as an Ambassador for ChildFund International (aka Christian Children's Fund).

Education
Hinton graduated from Starkville High School in 1997.  She later studied broadcast communications at Howard University.

Pageants
Hinton won the Miss District of Columbia USA 2002 title in November 2001, the first time she had competed in the competition. Hinton hails from Starkville, Mississippi and qualified to compete Miss District of Columbia USA as she was attending Howard University.

Hinton went on to represent the District of Columbia at the Miss USA 2002 pageant held in Gary, Indiana on 1 March 2002 where she became the fourth African American to win the Miss USA title.  The pageant marked the first time that 4 out of the 5 five finalists were African American.

Hinton later competed in the Miss Universe 2002 pageant in Puerto Rico in May that year.  As of 2010, she is one of only four Miss USA winners not to have placed among the semi-finalists in the Miss Universe pageant. The other three are Miss USA 1976 Barbara Peterson, Miss USA 1999 Kimberly Pressler, and Miss USA 2010 Rima Fakih.

Hinton spoke out on the Miss USA 2010 official photo controversy on Showbiz Tonight on May 5, HLN Prime News on May 10, 2010, and on several other news channels. She believes the photos are not racy, and that they represent "women comfortable in their own skin."

Casting
She plays a live action character, reporter Brittany Bhima, in the video game Command & Conquer 3: Tiberium Wars, released in 2007.

In 2009, Hinton played Jessica Warner  in 2 episodes of iCarly.

Filmography

References

External links
 

1979 births
American beauty pageant winners
Howard University alumni
Living people
Miss Universe 2002 contestants
Miss USA 2002 delegates
Miss USA winners
People from Starkville, Mississippi
African-American beauty pageant winners
21st-century African-American women
21st-century African-American people